Alpheus Brown Alger (October 8, 1854 – May 4, 1895) was a Massachusetts politician who served in the Massachusetts State Senate, as a member of the Board of Aldermen and as the Mayor of Cambridge, Massachusetts.

Biography
Alger was born to Edwin Alden and Amanda Malvina Alger, née Buswell, in Lowell, Massachusetts. 
From October 1875 to January 1877 Alger studied law at Harvard Law School and he was admitted to the bar for the County of Middlesex on June 4, 1877. After being admitted to the bar, he began practicing law with his father's firm, Brown & Alger in Boston while living in Cambridge. 
 
Alger was active in the Democratic party. From 1878 to 1891 Alger was a member of the Cambridge Democratic Committee, from 1884 to 1891 he was a member of Massachusetts' Democratic party state committee, and he represented Massachusetts' eight Congressional District at the 1888 Democratic National Convention. He died on May 4, 1895, in North Cambridge, Massachusetts.

References

1854 births
1895 deaths
Mayors of Cambridge, Massachusetts
Cambridge, Massachusetts City Council members
Democratic Party Massachusetts state senators
Harvard Law School alumni
1888 United States presidential election
19th-century American politicians
Harvard College alumni